3030 Press is an independent art and design book publisher founded in 2006 by John Millichap, in Hong Kong SAR, China.  The company focuses on producing books about the character and expression of new creativity in China since the introduction of economic reforms in 1978.

3030 Press’ first titles are selections of new photography, contemporary art and graphic design in China by practitioners aged under or around 30 years old.  The books seek to show the impact of new social and commercial forces on the creation of art and design, particularly among the generation born during the 1980s. As well as compilation surveys, 3030 Press also publishes monographs on some of China's most prominent young artists, including Chen Man and Lin Zhipeng. The company has co-produced several exhibitions in China based on its book projects.

Title sampling

John Millichap, Ou Ning and Gu Zheng, ‘’3030: New Photography in China.’’ 3030 Press, 2006. 
Javin Mo, ‘’3030: New Graphic Design in China.’’ 3030 Press, 2007.

Notes

References

External links
3030 Press website

Visual arts publishing companies
Publishing companies of China
Publishing companies established in 2006
2006 establishments in China